Armando Brancia (9 September 1917 – 20 June 1997) was an Italian film and television actor.

Life and career 
Born in Naples, Brancia started his acting career at a mature age playing some minor roles in several RAI TV-series. His breakout came in 1973, with the role of Aurelio Biondi in Federico Fellini's Amarcord. Following the critical and commercial success of the film, he started an intense career as a character actor working for notable directors including Luigi Comencini, Nanni Loy and Franco Brusati. He retired in the second half of the 1980s.

Filmography

References

External links 
 

1917 births
1997 deaths
Italian male film actors
Italian male television actors
Male actors from Naples
20th-century Italian male actors